Fabiana Berto  (born ) is a retired Brazilian female volleyball player, who played as a setter.

She was part of the Brazil women's national volleyball team at the 2001 FIVB World Grand Prix and 2002 FIVB Volleyball Women's World Championship in Germany. On club level she played with Club Atlético Estudiantes de Paraná.

Clubs
 Club Atlético Estudiantes de Paraná (2002)
 Esporte Clube Pinheiros (2008–09)

References

External links
FIVB Biography

1976 births
Living people
Brazilian women's volleyball players
Place of birth missing (living people)
Setters (volleyball)
Sportspeople from São Paulo